Melvin and Howard (stylized as Melvin (and Howard)) is a 1980 American comedy-drama film directed by Jonathan Demme. The screenplay by Bo Goldman was inspired by real-life Utah service station owner Melvin Dummar, who was listed as the beneficiary of $156 million in a will allegedly handwritten by Howard Hughes that was discovered in the headquarters of the Church of Jesus Christ of Latter-day Saints in Salt Lake City. A novelization of Goldman's script later was written by George Gipe. The film starred Paul Le Mat, Jason Robards, and, in an Academy Award-winning performance, Mary Steenburgen.

Plot
In the opening scene, Howard Hughes loses control of his motorcycle and crashes in the Nevada desert. That night, he is discovered lying on the side of a stretch of U.S. Highway 95 when Melvin Dummar stops his pickup truck so he can relieve himself. The disheveled stranger, refusing to allow Melvin to take him to the hospital, asks him to instead drive him to Las Vegas, Nevada. En route, the two engage in stilted conversation until Dummar cajoles his passenger into joining him in singing a Christmas song he wrote. Hughes then suggests they sing his favorite song "Bye Bye Blackbird", and they do. The man warms to his rescuer and  he is dropped off at the Desert Inn (which Hughes owns and therein resides).

Most of the remainder of the film focuses on Melvin's scattered, up-and-down life, his spendthrift, trust-in-luck nature, his rocky marital life with first wife Lynda, and his more stable relationship with second wife Bonnie. Lynda leaves him and their daughter to dance in a sleazy strip club, but eventually returns, but she remains frustrated by her husband's futile efforts to achieve the American dream. Melvin convinces her to appear on Easy Street, a game show hybrid of The Gong Show and Let's Make a Deal, and although her tap dancing initially is booed by the audience, she wins them over and nabs the top prize of living room furniture, a piano, and $10,000 cash.

Melvin agrees to invest in an affordable house in a new development, but while Lynda tries to keep their finances under control, he rashly buys a new Cadillac Eldorado and a boat, prompting her to take their daughter and toddler son and sue for divorce. Melvin is comforted by Bonnie, the payroll clerk at the dairy where he drives a truck, and the two eventually wed and move to Utah, where they take over the operation of a service station her relatives had owned.

One day, a mysterious man in a limousine stops at the station ostensibly to buy a pack of cigarettes, but after he drives off Melvin discovers an envelope marked "Last Will and Testament of Howard Hughes" on his office desk. Afraid to open it, he takes it to Mormon headquarters and secrets it in a pile of incoming mail.  It doesn't take long for the media to descend upon him and his family, and eventually Melvin finds himself in court, admitting he once met Hughes but vigorously denying he forged the will that finally fulfills his dreams.

Cast
 Paul Le Mat as Melvin Dummar
 Mary Steenburgen as Lynda West Dummar, Melvin's First Wife
 Pamela Reed as Bonnie Bonneau Dummar, Melvin's Second Wife
 Michael J. Pollard as "Little Red"
 Jack Kehoe as Jim Delgado
 Rick Lenz as Lawyer
 Dabney Coleman as Judge Keith Hayes
 Charles Napier as Ventura
 Jason Robards as Howard Hughes
 Cheryl Smith as Ronnie "Patient Ronnie"

The real Melvin Dummar has a cameo appearance as a man behind a bus depot counter. Gloria Grahame has a short appearance as Mrs. Sisk, but the majority of her role was cut.

Production
Parts of the film were shot in Salt Lake City and Willard, Utah as well as Las Vegas, Nevada.

Mary Steenburgen revealed that she was worried about having to appear completely naked in the film. "In a scene, I'm at a strip joint and I quit. I rip off what I'm wearing, throw it in the air, and walk naked out of the place. The night before the scene, I thought, 'Who is going to be there tomorrow? There's going to be a skeleton crew.' I didn't sleep that night, but I thought I was prepared for what was going to happen. I had totally forgotten there were going to be about sixty guys - extras from Central Casting - sitting around. I did it OK for about the first eight times, but I started to lose it. I was becoming upset because these guys kept making comments. I called Malcolm [McDowell], and he said,'Listen, you've done it. You have already put it on film. Do it one more time, and just try and do it real well.' I had lost sight of that. I was so busy worrying about my clothes I had forgotten about the moment of it. I knew it was a moment of bravery and freedom, and he reminded me of that. So I went back and I did it really well. As I walked out, I flipped off the construction hat of the guy at the bar and I waved goodbye to all the other dancers on the stage. That is the one they used," Steenburgen recalled.

Critical reception
Melvin and Howard currently holds a 91% "fresh" rating on Rotten Tomatoes based on 22 reviews.

In his review in The New York Times, Vincent Canby called the film a "sharp, engaging, very funny, anxious comedy" and commented, "Mr. Demme is a lyrical film maker for whom there is purpose in style...Melvin and Howard is commercial American movie-making of a most expansive, entertaining kind."

Roger Ebert of the Chicago Sun-Times described it as "wonderful" and added, "This is a slice of American life. It shows the flip side of Gary Gilmore's Utah. It is a world of mobile homes, Pop Tarts, dust, kids and dreams of glory. It's pretty clear how this movie got made. Hollywood started with the notion that the story of the mysterious Hughes will might make a good courtroom thriller. Well, maybe it would have. But my hunch is that when they met Dummar, they had the good sense to realize that they could get a better – and certainly a funnier – story out of what happened to him between the day he met Hughes and the day the will was discovered. Dummar is the kind of guy who thinks they oughta make a movie out of his life. This time, he was right."

Variety said, "Jonathan Demme's tour-de-force direction, the imaginative screenplay and top-drawer performances from a huge cast fuse in an unusual, original creation."

Pauline Kael gave the film a very positive review in The New Yorker: "Jonathan Demme's lyrical comedy Melvin and Howard which opened the New York Film Festival on September 26, is an almost flawless act of sympathetic imagination. I doubt if Jason Robards has ever been greater than he is here. Mary Steenburgen's Lynda Dummar has a soft mouth and a tantalizing slender wiggliness, and she talks directly to whomever she's talking to – when she listens, she's the kind of woman a man wants to tell more to. Demme shows perhaps a finer understanding of lower-middle-class life than any other American director."

Dennis Bingham's Whose Lives Are They Anyway? The Biopic as Contemporary Film Genre cites Melvin and Howard as the first film in the subgenre "biopic of someone undeserving," or "BOSUD," which was later popularized by Scott Alexander and Larry Karaszewski with Ed Wood, Man on the Moon, The People vs. Larry Flynt, and Auto Focus.

Paul Thomas Anderson has cited the film as one of his favorites. Jason Robards's last feature film appearance was in Anderson's Magnolia. Robert Ridgely, who played the host of the fictional "Easy Street" game show in this movie, would later be cast as Colonel James in Anderson's Boogie Nights.

The comedy show SCTV parodied the film in a sketch called "Melvin and Howards". Melvin (Rick Moranis), after picking up Howard Hughes (Joe Flaherty), also picks up Howard Cosell (Eugene Levy), Senator Howard Baker (Dave Thomas), and Curly Howard (John Candy).

Awards and nominations

See also
 List of American films of 1980
 The Amazing Howard Hughes (1977)

References

External links
 
 
 
 The AFI Catalog of Feature Films:..Melvin and Howard

1980 films
1980 comedy-drama films
American comedy-drama films
Cultural depictions of Howard Hughes
American films based on actual events
Fictional duos
Films directed by Jonathan Demme
Films featuring a Best Supporting Actress Academy Award-winning performance
Films featuring a Best Supporting Actress Golden Globe-winning performance
Films produced by Art Linson
Films set in the 1970s
Films set in California
Films set in Nevada
Films set in Utah
Films shot in California
Films shot in Nevada
Films shot in Utah
Films with screenplays by Bo Goldman
Films whose writer won the Best Original Screenplay Academy Award
Universal Pictures films
1980 comedy films
1980 drama films
National Society of Film Critics Award for Best Film winners
Films scored by Bruce Langhorne
1980s English-language films
1980s American films